Dorota Pomykała (born 3 July 1956) is a Polish actress. She has appeared in more than 50 films and television shows since 1953.

Selected filmography
 A Trap (1997)
 Retrieval (2006)
 The Dress (2020)

References

External links

1956 births
Living people
Polish film actresses
People from Silesian Voivodeship
Best Actress Robert Award winners